Jhelli Beam is a studio album by American rapper Busdriver. It was released on Anti- in 2009.

Critical reception

At Metacritic, which assigns a weighted average score out of 100 to reviews from mainstream critics, the album received an average score of 74, based on 12 reviews, indicating "generally favorable reviews".

Alan Ranta of PopMatters gave the album 8 stars out of 10, saying: "It is too intelligent and challenging to the status quo for the mainstream media to truly embrace, and Anti- seems to be lacking a little on the side of their hip-hop promotion department." Mosi Reeves of Spin gave the album 3.5 stars out of 5, writing: "Extraordinarily irrational and willfully convoluted, Jhelli Beam is avant-rap as quantum physics."

The opening track, "Split Seconds (Between Nannies and Swamis)", was described by Thomas Quinlan of URB as "Busdriver's simplest, most accessible rap jam, eschewing the bursts of rapid rap flows that usually accompany his slower style, and only occasionally bringing in a bit of sing-song." He gave the album 4 stars out of 5, stating: "While there's some experimentation with new ideas here, Jhelli Beam is familiar enough to leave Busdriver fans more than satisfied."

Track listing

Personnel
Credits adapted from liner notes.

 Busdriver – vocals, production (3, 11, 12, 14)
 Nosaj Thing – production (1)
 Omid – production (2, 10)
 Nobody – production (3, 6, 9)
 AntiMC – glockenspiel (3), electric guitar (4), bass guitar (8)
 Shawn Lee – string arrangement (3)
 Everton Nelson – violin (3)
 Warren Zielenski – violin (3)
 John Metcalfe – viola (3)
 Ian Burge – cello (3)
 Daedelus – production (4, 7, 11, 13)
 Nocando – vocals (5)
 Free the Robots – production (5)
 Greg Saunier – production (8)
 Myka 9 – vocals (9)
 Leticia – additional instrumentation (10)
 Create(!) – additional instrumentation (10)
 Nick Thorburn – vocals (11)
 John Dieterich – guitar (13), bass guitar (13), soundscape (13)
 Trevor Hernandez – artwork, design
 Bryan Sheffield – photography

References

Further reading

External links
 

2009 albums
Busdriver albums
Anti- (record label) albums